Kalin-e Khalaseh (also Romanized as Kalīn-e Khālaṣeh; also known as Kalīn-e Bālā, Kalīn, and Kelīn-e Bālā) is a village in Karimabad Rural District, Sharifabad District, Pakdasht County, Tehran Province, Iran. At the 2006 census, its population was 2,113, in 523 families.

References 

Populated places in Pakdasht County